Dolná Breznica is a village and municipality in Púchov District in the Trenčín Region of north-western Slovakia.

History
In historical records the village was first mentioned in 1388.

Geography
The municipality lies at an altitude of 297 metres and covers an area of 8.361 km². It has a population of about 818 people.

Genealogical resources

The records for genealogical research are available at the state archive "Statny Archiv in Bytca, Slovakia"

 Roman Catholic church records (births/marriages/deaths): 1788-1895 (parish B)

See also
 List of municipalities and towns in Slovakia

External links
 
 https://web.archive.org/web/20080111223415/http://www.statistics.sk/mosmis/eng/run.html
Surnames of living people in Dolna Breznica

Villages and municipalities in Púchov District